Lajin, full royal name al-Malik al-Mansur Hussam al-Din Lajin al-Mansuri (d. January 16, 1299, Cairo) was a Mamluk sultan of Egypt from 1296 to 1299. Originally Greek, he was a mamluk of Qalawun and had participated in the assassination of Qalawun's son the Sultan al-Ashraf Khalil. He also tried assassinating the Sultan al-Adil Kitbugha but failed. Kitbugha, fearing for his life, sent to him afterwards that he is ready to remove himself from the Sultanate for him to be the Sultan instead. Lajin agreed and became Sultan under the title al-Mansur Hussam al-Din, while Kitbugha was given a fief in the Levant.

External links
Sultan Lajin - History Avenue

Bahri sultans
13th-century Mamluk sultans
Muslims of the Crusades
1299 deaths
Year of birth unknown
Circassian Mamluks